Louis Picamoles (born 5 February 1986) is a French rugby union player who plays for Montpellier Hérault RC in the Top 14. Picamoles's usual position is at number eight.

Club career
Picamoles began his club career at Montpellier in 1999 and played for the club for ten years, in which he picked up 64 appearances. His first professional match was on 2 October 2004 against Auch during the 2004–05 Top 16 season. His last match was 16 May 2009, during the 2008–09 Top 14 season against Toulon.

For the 2009–10 Top 14 season, Picamoles signed with Toulouse, where in his debut season, he was part of the team that made it all the way to the semi-finals, losing to eventual runners-up Perpignan 19–6. In that season, his debut with Toulouse was a narrow 16–17 win against Montauban. That year he was a replacement for the final as Toulouse won the Heineken Cup.

On 2 November 2015, Picamoles joined Northampton Saints in the Aviva Premiership on a three-year deal from the 2016–17 season and made an instant impact, receiving three man of the match awards in the first three home games he featured in.

The number eight also won the Players' Player of the Season and Supporters' Player of the Season as well as the Champagne Moment of the Season at Northampton Saints End of Season Awards at Althorp house as well as scooping the Supporters Club Player of the Year the week before.

It was announced on Wednesday, May 31, 2017 that Picamoles would leave Northampton despite still having two seasons left on his contract to link back up with Montpellier Hérault RC. His former club paid Saints a record transfer fee of at least £1 million for the France international.

On 1 February 2021, Picamoles left Montpellier again to join with Top 14 rivals Bordeaux for the 2021–22 season.

International career
Picamoles has been a familiar face in the France national team since making his debut in 2008 – which was a 26–21 victory over Ireland during the 2008 Six Nations Championship. It was in 2008 that Picamoles scored his first try, against the Pacific Islanders on 15 November. Though part of the 2010 Six Nations Championship squad, Picamoles did not appear once in any of the five tests, in what turned out to be a Grand Slam campaign for Les Bleus. He was part of the 2011 Rugby World Cup squad that came runners-up to New Zealand, only playing in three tests during the tournament. After being dropped by Philippe Saint-André for most of 2014, a return to form with strong performances for Toulouse, saw Louis recalled to the French squad for the 2015 Six Nations Championship.

International tries

References

External links

FFR profile 
Louis Picamoles stats vs Australia
– YouTube

France international rugby union players
French rugby union players
Living people
Montpellier Hérault Rugby players
Rugby union flankers
Rugby union number eights
Stade Toulousain players
Northampton Saints players
1986 births
Union Bordeaux Bègles players
Rugby union players from Paris